Jimmy Van Malleghem is a DJ of progressive house and downtempo music. He was a large part of the "Delta Heavy Tour" with Sasha & John Digweed, in addition to performing with many other DJs, such as James Zabiela and Lee Burridge. He has released a few singles as well as mix albums on Ultra Records and Bedrock Records. He is more known for his warm up set than his peak time performances.

Jimmy Van M was born in Belgium, but moved to Orlando, Florida in the United States at age 10. In 1995, he founded the Balance Promote Group, a DJ booking agency and record pool. In 2000, he released his first mix compilation Trance Nation America and followed this up with 2001's Bedrock: Compiled & Mixed album. His third album, Balance 010 of EQ / Stomp's Balance series, is a three disc compilation featuring a "downtempo" disc, a "midtempo" disc, and an "uptempo" disc, with the tempo building throughout the three. The first disc starts at 65 beats per minute and the third ends at 126 beats per minute.

References

External links
Official Website

Living people
Belgian electronic musicians
Year of birth missing (living people)